Rising Star High School is a public high school located in Rising Star, Texas (USA) and classified as a 1A school by the UIL. It is part of the Rising Star Independent School District located in south central Eastland County. In 2013, the school was rated "Met Standard" by the Texas Education Agency.

Athletics
The Rising Star Wildcats compete in the following sports 

Basketball
Cross Country
6-Man Football
Golf
Tennis
Track and Field
Softball

State titles
Boys Track 
1950(B)
Girls Track 
1978(B)
UIL Cross-Examination Debate
2011
Marching Band
2015
Girls Doubles Tennis
2017
Boys Golf
2018
UIL Social Studies 
2017 and 2018

See also

List of Six-man football stadiums in Texas
List of high schools in Texas

References

External links
Rising Star ISD

Public high schools in Texas
Public middle schools in Texas
Schools in Eastland County, Texas